The 2018 VMI Keydets football team represented the Virginia Military Institute in the 2018 NCAA Division I FCS football season. It was VMI's 128th football season. The Keydets were led by fourth-year head coach Scott Wachenheim. They played their home games at 10,000–seat Alumni Memorial Field at Foster Stadium. They were a member of the Southern Conference (SoCon). They finished the season 1–10, 0–8 in SoCon play to finish in last place.

Previous season
The Keydets finished the 2017 season 0–11, 0–8 in SoCon play to finish in last place. This was VMI's fourth winless season and the first time they had gone winless since 2004.

Preseason

Preseason media poll
The SoCon released their preseason media poll on July 25, 2018, with the Keydets predicted to finish in last place. The same day the coaches released their preseason poll with the Keydets also predicted to finish in last place.

Preseason All-SoCon teams
The Keydets placed one player on the preseason all-SoCon teams.

Offense

2nd team

Brad Davis – OL

Schedule

Source:

Projected depth chart

Game summaries

at Toledo

at Wofford

East Tennessee State

at Western Carolina

Mercer

at Samford

The Citadel

at Chattanooga

Tusculum

Furman

at Old Dominion

References

VMI
VMI Keydets football seasons
VMI Keydets football